Rye Cross is a hamlet in south-west Worcestershire 1 mile  west of Castlemorton, 0.5 miles east of Berrow  and 1 mile south of Hollybush, near the borders of Gloucestershire and Herefordshire. Eastnor Castle and the towns of Malvern, and Ledbury are nearby.  There are several  traditional English pubs in the area.

Population 
The 2000 census showed the area to have a population of <700 (Castlemorton, Birtsmorton, Rye Cross, Berrow predominantly)

Hamlets in Worcestershire